Holothrips speciossissimus is a species of thrips in the family Phlaeothripidae, first described in 1920 as Nesothrips speciossissimus by Heinrich Hugo Karny, from a specimen collected at Cedar Creek in Queensland.

It is found in the wet tropics of the Cape York peninsula.

Further reading

References

Taxa named by Heinrich Hugo Karny
Insects described in 1920
Phlaeothripidae
Thrips